Émile Napoléon Baumann (1835–1910) was a French horticulturalist.

References

French horticulturists
1835 births
1910 deaths
Women horticulturists and gardeners